Bridgetown Secondary School is a school in the Western Cape.

References

Educational institutions with year of establishment missing
High schools in South Africa
Schools in the Western Cape